Sankt Georgen Graduate School of Philosophy and Theology (German: Philosophisch-Theologische Hochschule Sankt Georgen) is a higher education Jesuit college in Frankfurt am Main, Germany.

The school offers a 10-semester Magister in Catholic Theology and a 6-semester Bachelor in Philosophy. Post-graduate students may earn the degrees of Licentiate (Lic. theol.), Doctorate (Dr. theol., Ph.D.), or Habilitation (Dr. theol. habil.). Additional interdisciplinary programs are offered as well.

Campus and Institutions 
The campus, situated within a historic park in the Sachsenhausen district of Frankfurt, contains the classroom building, the office building (Lindenhaus), the academic library, the college restaurant (Mensa), the major seminary, the college church, and the Jesuit community.

The campus hosts as well two institutions founded by the German Bishops' Conference: the "Institute for Global Church and Mission (IWM)" and an Institute for Christian-Muslim relations ("Cibedo"). Its library, with more than 12,000 volumes, stands out as the largest library for Christian-Muslim dialogue in Germany. The main college library, which incorporated the collections of various Jesuit libraries and holds nearly 500,000 volumes, is known for its rich collection of Jesuit-related literature.

In the interdiocesan major seminary, 30 seminarians of several German dioceses, mainly of Limburg, Hamburg, Osnabrück, Hildesheim, are studying for the Roman Catholic priesthood. 20 post-graduate students, mostly priests, from all over the world are living in the same seminary, pursuing doctoral or licentiate programs.

History 

The school was founded in 1926 by the Society of Jesus as an academic seminary for training candidates to the priesthood, initially only for the Diocese of Limburg, but soon for other German dioceses as well. Until 1951 the school was exclusively an (inter-)diocesan seminary, led by Jesuits. From 1951 until 1975, the school included two parallel institutions: the "Philosophical-Theological Academy" for diocesan candidates and the "Theological Faculty S.J." for Jesuit students. In 1976, the school began admitting lay theology students (male and female), and these quickly formed the majority of students.

In 1986, Jorge Mario Bergoglio, since 13 March 2013 Pope Francis, spent a few months at the Sankt Georgen PTH to consult with professors on a dissertation project, however he has not further pursued the project.

The 1993 college church and the 2005 classroom building are both notable works of modern architecture.

In 2009 the Institute for Global Church and Mission (IWM) (German: Institut für Weltkirche und Mission) was founded. In 2010–2017, IWM students ran the Student Initiative Rahel, which organised the financing of scholarships for disadvantaged young people in Adigrat, northern Ethiopia.

Notable people

Faculty 
 Oswald von Nell-Breuning SJ (1890–1991)
 Aloys Grillmeier SJ (1910–1998)
 Otto Semmelroth SJ (1912–1979)
 Norbert Lohfink SJ (born 1928)
 Rupert Lay SJ (born 1929)
 Friedhelm Hengsbach SJ (born 1937)
 Medard Kehl SJ (born 1942)
 Bruno Schüller SJ (1925−2007)
 Michael Sievernich SJ (born 1944)
 Jörg Splett (born 1936)

Alumni 
 Stephan Ackermann (born 1963), Bishop of Trier (Germany)
 Karl Josef Becker (1928–2015), Jesuit, theologian, cardinal
 Alfred Delp (1907–1945), Jesuit and philosopher of the German Resistance during the Second World War
 Farid Esack (born 1959), South African Muslim scholar and political activist
 Luis Ladaria Ferrer (born 1944), Jesuit, Archbishop, Prefect of the Congregation for the Doctrine of the Faith
 Jean-Claude Hollerich (born 1958), Jesuit, Archbishop of Luxembourg
 Wilhelm Kempf (1906–1982), Catholic theologian, Bishop of Limburg 1949–1981
 Federico Lombardi (born 1942), Italian Jesuit, former director of the Holy See Press Office
 Juan Antonio Martínez Camino (born 1953), Jesuit, Auxiliary Bishop in Madrid
 Blessed Johannes Prassek (1911–1943), priest opposing the Nazi regime, one of the Lübeck martyrs
 Wolfgang Rösch (born 1959), priest, vicar general of Limburg (Germany)
 Jon Sobrino (born 1928), Jesuit and theologian (liberation theology) in El Salvador
 Michael Wüstenberg (born 1954), Bishop of Aliwal (South Africa)
 Lothar Zenetti (1926-2019), German priest and writer

See also 

 Munich School of Philosophy
 List of Jesuit sites

References 

Jesuit universities and colleges
Postgraduate schools in Germany
Catholic universities and colleges in Germany
Universities and colleges in Frankfurt
Educational institutions established in 1926
1926 establishments in Germany
Seminaries and theological colleges in Germany
Christianity in Frankfurt